Vexillum gloriae is a species of small sea snail, marine gastropod mollusk in the family Costellariidae, the ribbed miters.

Description

Distribution

References

 (description)    http://www.poppe-images.com/?t=17&photoid=956951

gloriae
Gastropods described in 2009